The Singelgracht is the waterway that borders the entire Amsterdam Center and flows along the Nassaukade, Stadhouderskade and Mauritskade.
Formerly the canal and the ramparts on the city side formed the outer defenses of the city.

Name

The name is related to the Dutch word omsingelen, "to surround", and comes ultimately from Latin cingulum, meaning "belt".
Other Dutch towns also have ring-shaped canals named Singel.

History and course

After the fourth expansion of the canal ring around 1660, the outer canal – with the ramparts that formed the defenses – became the boundary of the city. 
Within these ramparts there were strongholds on which mills were placed. 
As a result, the canal had a curvy course. 
Parallel to the Singelgracht, on the inside of the ramparts lay the Lijnbaansgracht, named after the lanes that lay there. 
Parts of the strongholds were demolished and the canal was straightened there. 
The old winding course can still be recognized in a few places. 
Of the mills on the strongholds, two remain, both moved to new locations: De Gooyerat to the Zeeburgerstraat in Amsterdam-Oost and De Bloem to the Haarlemmerweg.

For two centuries, Amsterdam had a characteristic crescent-shaped layout. 
In the last quarter of the 19th century, Amsterdam expanded beyond the Singelgracht. 
The ramparts were demolished and Marnixstraat, Weteringschans and Sarphatistraat were developed.

Bridges

The section of the Singelgracht  between the Westerkanaal and the Rotterdammerbrug is part of the shipping connection (standing mast route) between the IJ and the Kattensloot / Kostverlorenvaart, with movable bridges on either side of the Willemspoort . 
The other bridges over the Singelgracht are fixed bridges.

Confusion with the  Singel 
The Amsterdam Singelgracht is often confused with the Singel.

The canal called the Singel forms the border of the medieval city center parallel to the Herengracht.
The Singelgracht is the waterway that borders the entire Center. 
The name only indicates the canal, not the adjacent built-up quays. 
Partly for this reason the name is less known than that of other canals. 
On the outside of the canal are the Nassaukade (west), Stadhouderskade (south) and Mauritskade (east); on the center side the Marnixkade, Leidsekade, Nicolaas Witsenkade, Sarphatikade , Huddekade, Spinozastraat and Alexanderkade.

Gallery

See also 

Canals of Amsterdam

References

External links
 De bocht in de Singelgracht - amsterdamsebinnenstad.nl
 Bolwerken van Amsterdam - centrum.amsterdam.nl
 De laatste stadswal van Amsterdam - ernestkurpershoek.nl
 De ommuurde stad - lubberhuizen.nl

Canals in Amsterdam